Saturday Night Thunder is a former ESPN program that showed  USAC racing on Saturday nights. It began on Thursday nights with the name Thursday Night Thunder on ESPN2. It featured dirt (like Ascot Park in Gardena, California) or paved oval tracks around the United States, although it frequently featured tracks in the Indianapolis area. Various racing series were televised, including Silver Crown, midget, and sprint cars. The series witnessed drivers like Jeff Gordon's rise prior to moving to NASCAR. It also saw the death of driver Rich Vogler.

During the summer of 1993, the program also featured the Fast Masters series.

In 2023, the Thursday Night Thunder name will be revived as the Superstar Racing Experience moves from CBS to ESPN.

References

Open wheel racing
Dirt track racing in the United States
ESPN original programming
Auto racing mass media